The 1997 Tirreno–Adriatico was the 32nd edition of the Tirreno–Adriatico cycle race and was held from 12 March to 19 March 1997. The race started in Sorrento and finished in San Benedetto del Tronto. The race was won by Roberto Petito of the Saeco team.

General classification

References

1997
1997 in Italian sport